Preah Ram I (1544–May 1596), also known as Reamea Chung Prey, was the Cambodian king ruled from 1594 to 1596.

In 1594, Cambodia was attacked by Siamese, Chey Chettha I and Satha I fled the capital. Preah Ram I seized the throne during the absence of the king. In May 1596, he was killed at Sri Sundhara by the Portuguese and Spanish adventures.

See also
Siamese–Cambodian War (1591–1594)
Cambodian–Spanish War

References

1544 births
1596 deaths
16th-century Cambodian monarchs